Ilya Lyubimov is a Russian actor. He appeared in more than 60 films.

Biography
Ilya was born on February 21, 1977. At the age of 11 he began working at the Theater of the Young Muscovite. In 1993 he entered the directing department of Russian Institute of Theatre Arts.

Selected filmography

References

External links 
 Ilya Lyubimov on kino-teatr.ru

Russian male film actors
1977 births
Living people